Jorge "Coque" Malla (born 22 October 1969, in Madrid) is a Spanish musician and actor, frontman of the group Los Ronaldos (Founded in 1985). His mother was the actress Amparo Valle, who died on 29 September 2016.

Filmography

He starred in the 1994 film Todo es mentira with Penélope Cruz, and in the 1998 film Nothing in the Fridge alongside María Esteve. He won a Goya Award for Best Original Song ("Este es el momento") in the film Campeones.

Discography 
 Soy un astronauta más (1999)
 Sueños (2004)
 La hora de los gigantes (2009)
 La hora de los gigantes - Edición especial (2010)
 Termonuclear (2011)
 Termonuclear en casa de Coque Malla (2011)
 Mujeres (2013) — duets with Leonor Watling, Ángela Molina, Anni B Sweet, Jeanette, Alondra Bentley 
 Canta a Rubén Blades (2015)
 El último hombre en la Tierra (2016)
 Irrepetible (2018) — duets with Neil Hannon of the Divine Comedy
 ¿Revolución? (2019) 
 El Astronauta Gigante (2021)
 Jorge, una travesía de Coque Malla (2023)

References

External links

Spanish male film actors
20th-century Spanish male actors
1970 births
Living people
Spanish musicians
Male actors from Madrid